The Serie B 1973–74 was the forty-second tournament of this competition played in Italy since its creation.

Teams
Parma, SPAL and Avellino had been promoted from Serie C, while Atalanta, Palermo and Ternana had been relegated from Serie A.

Final classification

Results

References and sources
Almanacco Illustrato del Calcio - La Storia 1898-2004, Panini Edizioni, Modena, September 2005

Serie B seasons
2
Italy